The Venerable Arnold Wood, M.A. (24 October 1918 – 27 April 2007) was Archdeacon of Cornwall from 1981 to 1988.

Wood was educated at Trinity Academy, Halifax and was a Commissioned Officer in the RASC from 1939 to 1949. He worked in engineering at CMI from 1949 to 1963. He studied for ordination at Trinity College, Bristol; and was ordained in 1966. After a curacy at Kirkheaton he held incumbencies at Mount Pellon, Lanreath, and Pelynt. He was Rural Dean of West Wivelshire from 1976 to 1981; and a member of the General Synod of the Church of England from 1985 to 1988. He was also a General Commissioner of Income Tax from 1977 to 1993.

Notes

20th-century English Anglican priests
Archdeacons of Cornwall
1918 births
2007 deaths
People educated at Trinity Academy, Halifax
Alumni of Trinity College, Bristol
Royal Army Service Corps officers
British Army personnel of World War II
Members of the General Synod of the Church of England